Mount Nasorolevu is the highest mountain on the island of Vanua Levu in Fiji. Its height is 3,385 feet or 1,032 meters, making it the fourth highest peak of Fiji, Elevation: 3386. It is located at Latitude: -16.6167 and Longitude: 179.4.

References

External links 
 Peakbagger.com
 Amatur-hikers.com

Nasorolevu
Vanua Levu